Délifrance is a bakery company that produces "French style" bakery, savoury and snacking products in over 100 countries on five continents. It has been in operation since 1983. The sister company of Délifrance is Grands Moulins de Paris, which is a major French milling company and supplies 100% of the flour used in Délifrance's products.

Délifrance has 12 subsidiaries in Europe and the Middle East. Its restaurants serve "French style" baked products such as croissants, gâteaux, fougasses, pains au chocolat, brioches, crisp praline, and baguettes. Most Délifrance restaurants also serve beverages, coffee and pasta.

History
In 1919, the Vilgrain family created Les Grands Moulins de Paris which boosted the bakery industry. Délifrance was born in 1983 and produced viennoiserie, patisserie, and savoury products.

In 1997, Sembawang Corporation Limited acquired controlling interest of Délifrance Asia Ltd. In 1999, Prudential Asset Management Asia Limited (PAMA) Group Inc. acquired 100% of Délifrance Asia Ltd and took it private.

In December 2007, Singapore-listed company Auric Pacific Group Limited purchased Délifrance Asia Ltd from PAMA for SGD75 Million; Auric Pacific Group was privatized in 2017.

In the Philippines, Jollibee Foods Corporation operated Délifrance from 1995 to 2010, when both companies severed their ties. All former Délifrance restaurants in the Philippines were relaunched as CaféFrance, which was later sold by Jollibee to Euro-Med Laboratories Philippines, Inc.

Délifrance ran several franchises in Malaysia until 2015, but as of 2016 all outlets appear to have closed without official notice. In 2020, Délifrance returned to the Malaysian market with the opening an outlet at Publika Shopping Gallery in Kuala Lumpur.

Timeline
1978 — Délifrance invents the frozen parbaked baguette. 
1982 — Délifrance creates the Pariguette range (Modified Atmosphere Packaging (MAP) parbaked bread which keeps for several months at room temperature). 
1983 — Délifrance invents the first frozen ready-to-bake viennoiserie. 
1985 — Délifrance introduces ready-to-bake viennoiserie products that prove and bake in the oven at the same time. 
1995 — Délifrance's launches its Provencette concept, Délifrance's "turn-key" solution offered for the catering market.
1997 — Délifrance launches its new jambon product to the Irish market 
1999 — Délifrance launches its "Eco-Products" range 
2000 — Délifrance launched the "Déliquick" bread range based on its "Thaw & Serve" concept.

Food
Today, the Délifrance range includes over 1000 products including bread, viennoiseries, patisseries and savoury products.

Different modes of utilisation:
Thaw and serve - frozen
Part-baked - frozen
Ready to bake rapide - frozen
Ready to bake - frozen
Ready to prove - frozen
Gas packed

See also
 List of bakery cafés

References

External links

 Official website
 Délifrance Asia Ltd
 Délifrance Hong Kong

Bakery cafés
Tea houses
Restaurant franchises
Fast-food chains of France
Bakeries of France
French brands